Dietrich Henschel (born 1967) is a German baritone.

Life and career
Born in Berlin, Henschel grew up in Nürnberg where he attended high school and studied piano and conducting.

After this, from 1993 to 1995 he was an ensemble member of the Theater Kiel. Under director Peter Dannenberg and musical director , he performed in many operas by Mozart, Monteverdi and Gluck.

After working in Bonn and Stuttgart, in 1997, Henschel's international career began when he took on the title role in Henze's  at the  under Götz Friedrich and Busoni's  with the Opéra National de Lyon under Kent Nagano.

In addition, Henschel has also made a name as a song interpreter. The focus of his repertoire has been the works of Ludwig van Beethoven and Franz Schubert, along with Hugo Wolf, Gustav Mahler and Erich Wolfgang Korngold. He has performed with Irwin Gage, Fritz Schwinghammer, Helmut Deutsch, Leonard Hokanson and Shinya Okahara:  since 1996 he has regularly toured Japan with Okahara.   He has made numerous recordings on CD, including with the Freiburg Baroque Orchestra under René Jacobs, Bach's St Matthew Passion with the  Concentus Musicus Wien, under Nikolaus Harnoncourt, and the recording of Busoni's Doktor Faust, which in 2001 won a 
Grammy Award for Best Opera Recording.

References

External links
 
 Wunderhorn: entretien avec Dietrich Henschel, baryton (in French) interview on classicagenda.fr

1967 births
Living people
German operatic baritones
Singers from Berlin